A werewolf, in folklore, is a person who changes into a wolf.

Werewolf may also refer to:

Film and television
 The Werewolf (1913 film), a 1913 American silent film
 The Werewolf (1956 film), a 1956 American film
 Werewolf (1996 film), a direct-to-video horror film featured on Mystery Science Theater 3000
 Werewolf (2016 film), a 2016 Canadian film
 Werewolf (2018 film), a 2018 Polish film screened at the 2019 Toronto After Dark Film Festival
 Werewolf (TV series), an American horror series on Fox network from 1987
 "Werewolves" (CSI), a 2006 sixth season episode of CSI: Crime Scene Investigation

Music
 "Werewolf", a song by Fiona Apple from The Idler Wheel...
 "Werewolf", a song by Michael Hurley from Armchair Boogie, covered by Cat Power on You Are Free
 "Werewolf", a song by CocoRosie
 "Werewolf", a song by the Five Man Electrical Band
 "Werewolf", a song by Krokus from Painkiller
 "The Werewolf", a song by Paul Simon from Stranger to Stranger
 The Werewolfs, a band featuring Derf Scratch

Literature
 Werewolf (Dell Comics), a 1966-1967 character
 Werewolf by Night, a Marvel Comics character debuting in 1972
The Werewolf, a 1933 treatise by Montague Summers
Werewolf (DC Comics), a comics supervillain in the DC Universe

Games
 Werewolf (social deduction game), a party game
 Werewolf: The Apocalypse, a role-playing game
 Werewolf: The Forsaken, a role-playing game, its successor
 Werewolf: The Last Warrior, a video game for Nintendo Entertainment System
 Werewolf (Dungeons & Dragons), a lycanthrope in the Dungeons & Dragons game

Other uses
 Kamov Ka-50, a helicopter
 VMFA-122, a U.S. Marine Corps squadron
Libahunt ("The Werewolf"), a 1912 Estonian play written by August Kitzberg
 Werewolf, a codename for a Fedora operating system release
 Werewolf, a variant of the Wolfsangel symbol

See also
 Werwolf, a plan for a Nazi commando unit for the defence of Germany
 Werewolf syndrome, an abnormal amount of hair growth over the body
 Wolf man (disambiguation)